210th Aviation Regiment is aviation regiment of the United States Army.

History

The 210th Combat Aviation Battalion joined the 12th Aviation Group (Combat) on 15 January 1968 at Long Thanh with the following units:
 120th Assault Helicopter Company at Long Binh
 125th Air Traffic Control Company at Bien Hoa
 16th Signal Company (Hyper Nav) at Tan Son Nhut
 USARV Flight Detachment at Long Thanh

Campaign Participation Credit
Vietnam:
 Counteroffensive, Phase II
 Counteroffensive, Phase III
 Tet Counteroffensive
 Counteroffensive, Phase IV
 Counteroffensive, Phase V
 Counteroffensive, Phase VI
 Tet 69/Counteroffensive
 Summer-Fall 1969
 Winter-Spring 1970
 Sanctuary Counteroffensive
 Counteroffensive, Phase VII
 Consolidation I

Current configuration

 1st Battalion
 2nd Battalion

References

210